Mary Pierce was the defending champion but lost in the third round to Mirjana Lučić.

Martina Hingis won in the final 6–3, 2–6, 6–3 against Venus Williams.

Seeds
A champion seed is indicated in bold text while text in italics indicates the round in which that seed was eliminated. The top eight seeds received a bye to the second round.

  Martina Hingis (champion)
  Jana Novotná (second round)
  Amanda Coetzer (second round)
  Mary Pierce (third round)
  Arantxa Sánchez-Vicario (semifinals)
  Monica Seles (third round)
  Conchita Martínez (third round)
  Iva Majoli (third round)
  Venus Williams (final)
  Irina Spîrlea (third round)
  Nathalie Tauziat (first round)
  Sandrine Testud (quarterfinals)
  Dominique Van Roost (third round)
  Anna Kournikova (quarterfinals)
  Lisa Raymond (quarterfinals)
  Patty Schnyder (first round)

Draw

Finals

Top half

Section 1

Section 2

Bottom half

Section 3

Section 4

External links
 Official results archive (ITF)
 Official results archive (WTA)

Women's Singles
Singles